Humberto Osorio Botello (born 24 June 1988) is a Colombian professional football who plays for Club Jorge Wilstermann as a forward.

Career
Osorio joined Valladolid on 16 July 2013, in a three-year deal which saw him earn €350,000 per season. He made his debut on 17 August, as a substitute in a 2–1 home defeat to Athletic Bilbao. On 27 September he scored his first goal, in a 2–2 home draw with Málaga CF, and scored both of the team's goals on 9 February as they ended with the same result against Elche CF. He scored the equaliser against Real Madrid in a 1–1 home draw on 7 May. At the end of the season, Valladolid were relegated to the Second Division.

Honours
América de Cali
 Categoría Primera A - Torneo Finalización: 2008

References

External links

1988 births
Living people
People from Valledupar
Colombian footballers
Colombian expatriate footballers
Association football forwards
Estudiantes de Mérida players
América de Cali footballers
Atlético Bucaramanga footballers
Cúcuta Deportivo footballers
Ayacucho FC footballers
Millonarios F.C. players
San Martín de San Juan footballers
Real Valladolid players
Club Tijuana footballers
Dorados de Sinaloa footballers
Defensa y Justicia footballers
Independiente Santa Fe footballers
Águilas Doradas Rionegro players
C.D. Jorge Wilstermann players
Categoría Primera A players
Categoría Primera B players
Peruvian Primera División players
Argentine Primera División players
La Liga players
Liga MX players
Colombian expatriate sportspeople in Argentina
Colombian expatriate sportspeople in Peru
Colombian expatriate sportspeople in Venezuela
Colombian expatriate sportspeople in Spain
Colombian expatriate sportspeople in Mexico
Colombian expatriate sportspeople in Bolivia
Expatriate footballers in Argentina
Expatriate footballers in Peru
Expatriate footballers in Venezuela
Expatriate footballers in Spain
Expatriate footballers in Mexico
Expatriate footballers in Bolivia